

The Prashansaniya Seva Padakkama (PSP, Commendable Service Medal) (Sinhala: ප්‍රසංශනීය සේවා පදක්කම prasanṣanīya sēvā padakkama) is a medal awarded by the Military of Sri Lanka to all noncomissioned officers and seamen of the Sri Lanka Volunteer Naval Force in recognition of "long, meritorious, loyal, valuable, service and unblemished conduct". It was established on 31 January 2000, and does not confer any individual precedence.

Award process
Ranks of Petty Officers and below are eligible for the award who, by or after 22 May 1972, have completed 18 years qualifying service. Recipients are entitled to use the post-nominal letters "PSP".

References

External links
Sri Lanka Navy
Ministry of Defence : Sri Lanka

Military awards and decorations of Sri Lanka
Awards established in 2000
Long service medals
2000 establishments in Sri Lanka